Vasily Bykov is a project 22160 patrol ship of the Russian Navy, of which it was the first ship built. It was laid down on 26 February 2014 on the Zelenodolsk Shipyard at Zelenodolsk in Tatarstan, Russia, and launched on 28 August 2017.

Operational history
The island was bombarded with the ships' guns before Russian Naval Infantry landed. The confrontation ended with the Russian takeover of Snake Island.

On 7 March 2022, the Ukrainian authorities claimed that the Armed Forces of Ukraine had attacked Vasily Bykov using a shore based multiple rocket launcher system off the coast of Odessa, stating that the ship had been heavily damaged or even sunk. However, on 16 March 2022, Vasily Bykov was seen returning to the Sevastopol Naval Base of the Russian Black Sea Fleet in Sevastopol, with no damage visible. Later, on the last day of June, Russian forces retreated from Snake Island. Earlier, on 14 April 2022, the ship the Vasily Bykov had attacked Snake Island with, the Moskva, had been sunk.

In June 2022, Vasily Bykov was for the first time equipped with a self-contained fighting module of the Tor-M2KM air-defence system, installed on its helicopter deck.

See also
 "Russian warship, go fuck yourself"

References

2017 ships
Patrol vessels of the Russian Navy
Ships built in Russia
Ships involved in the 2022 Russian invasion of Ukraine
Maritime incidents in 2022
Southern Ukraine campaign